The Sukhoi Su-12 (Aircraft RK) was a prototype Soviet reconnaissance and artillery spotter aircraft developed during World War II.

Development
In November 1943, the Sukhoi OKB designed an artillery spotter aircraft based on the German Focke-Wulf Fw 189. As designed, the aircraft had a crew of three and was powered by a pair of Shvetsov M-62 engines. The aircraft was initially denied funding but was eventually approved thanks to an intervention by the Soviet Chief Marshal of Artillery N.N. Voronov. As a result of evolving specifications, the crew was increased to four and the engines were changed to more powerful Shvetsov ASh-82M with 1,640 kW (2,200 hp).

The Su-12 prototype flew on 26 August 1947 with N.D. Fikson at the controls. The test flight program was completed by 30 October. Due to problems with the ASh-82M engines, the powerplant was changed to ASh-82FN making 1,380 kW (1,850 hp), but while reliable, the less-powerful engines caused the Su-12 to miss its top speed and service ceiling specifications. The Su-12 successfully completed government testing in September 1949 and was recommended for production. Due to lack of production capacity in the USSR, in October 1949 it was proposed to build the airplane in Czechoslovakia. However, the application for production was denied, citing failure to meet performance specifications. Subsequent efforts by the Sukhoi Design Bureau to secure funding and continue work on the Su-12 were denied.

Operators

Soviet Air Force

Specifications (Su-12)

See also

References
Antonov,Vladimir & Gordon, Yefim & others. ''OKB Sukhoi”. Leicester. Midland. 1996.

External links

Notes

Su-12
1940s Soviet military reconnaissance aircraft
Abandoned military aircraft projects of the Soviet Union
Twin-boom aircraft
Aircraft first flown in 1947
Twin piston-engined tractor aircraft